The sixth season of Pilipinas Got Talent is a talent reality competition that aired on ABS-CBN from January 6 to April 29, 2018, replacing Little Big Shots Philippines. It aired on Saturdays at 7:00 p.m. and Sundays at 7:30 p.m. (PST). In March 2020, the season temporarily returned to air on Sundays, filling the second half timeslot of The Voice Teens, due to the enhanced community quarantine in Luzon done in response to the COVID-19 pandemic in the Philippines. However, the re-runs were abruptly cut after ABS-CBN was forced to indefinitely stop operations.

Development
During the June 3, 2017, episode of It's Showtime, Billy Crawford announced that there will be auditions for the sixth season of the show. A teaser was shown during the commercial break of It's Showtime and the finals of I Can Do That. The initial audition dates and locations were shown during the commercial break of the Battles of The Voice Teens on June 11, 2017.

Host and judges

In October 2017, ABS-CBN released several teasers that showed every judge from the previous season. Billy Crawford returned for his hosting duty while Luis Manzano no longer returned as host since he is also hosting the game show I Can See Your Voice. Manzano was replaced by Toni Gonzaga. Jervi Li, commonly known as KaladKaren Davila, hosts the online show Pilipinas Got Talent Exclusives which is broadcast on the official YouTube and Facebook accounts of the show.

2020 re-run
As a result of the 2020 Luzon enhanced community quarantine, the sixth season of Pilipinas Got Talent returned on air on March 29, 2020, temporarily replacing the second season of The Voice Teens on Sundays until the network was forced off the air.

Auditions

Pre-auditions
The pre-auditions for the sixth season took place in key cities in the Philippines. Pre-auditions were held in Manila, Baguio, Lucena, Batangas, and Cebu. The pre-auditions were judged by Pilipinas Got Talent staff; those who passed will proceed to the live auditions.

Live auditions
The first live auditions in front of the four judges were taped on November 20–22, 2017 at the SM Seaside City Cebu in Cebu City. The Manila leg of live auditions will be taped on January 10–12 at Tanghalang Pasigueño in Pasig, Metro Manila.

Like the previous season, voting works on a majority-of-three basis. If an act receives three or more "yes" votes from the judges, they advance to the judges' cull.

The live auditions once again feature the Golden Buzzer. Each judge would have one chance to use the Golden Buzzer throughout the auditions. New for this season, apart from the judges, the hosts (as one) get an opportunity to press the Golden Buzzer, bringing the total number of Golden Acts to five. The so-called Golden Acts, those on whom the Golden Buzzer is used, would automatically advance to the semifinals. Garcia was the first to press his golden buzzer for the pull up bars exhibition group, Bardilleranz. Locsin was next to press the golden buzzer for the wheelchair dance duo, Julius Obrero & Rhea Marquez. Padilla used his golden buzzer for hip-hop dance group, Nocturnal Dance Company. Viceral was the last judge to use the golden buzzer and gave it to spiral pole dancer, Kristel de Catalina. Crawford and Gonzaga was the last to use the golden buzzer and gave it to the acrobatic duo, DWC Aeon Flex. Garcia, Locsin, and Padilla used their golden buzzers in the Cebu auditions while Viceral and the hosts, Crawford and Gonzaga, used their golden buzzers in the Manila auditions.

Below are the acts who are confirmed within the show to have received at least three Yes votes and thus had successfully passed their auditions, as well as the Golden Acts. The list does not cover everyone who had passed. Due to time constraints, some acts, named or otherwise, are seen with their fates partially known (only one or two known Yes vote) or edited out completely from broadcast and are thus not listed.

Judges Cull 
The Judges Cull was held at ABS-CBN Studios, Quezon City, Metro Manila. It was shown at the end of the final auditions episode on March 18, 2018. Throughout the auditions, 98 acts have received at least 3 yeses from the judges. Apart from the 5 golden buzzer acts, the judges picked 23 acts who would compete in the live semifinals, bringing the total to 28.

This is the first season to feature 28 semifinalists only, as opposed to previous seasons with 36 semifinalists (quarterfinalists in season 4). The number of semifinalists, which is not divisible by six, takes into account the five Golder Buzzer acts and the abbreviated second semifinal on April 1; the Saturday before (March 31) would be Black Saturday.

Top 28 Result Summary

Semifinals
The Semifinals began on March 24, 2018, in Newport Performing Arts Theater, Resorts World Manila in Pasay, Metro Manila. Each week (except week 2), performances from four out of six acts took place on Saturday nights, while during Sunday nights, the two remaining acts performed and the results are announced on the same night.

Garcia missed the five semifinal rounds due to the death of his spouse. Due to his absence, his buzzer was removed from the stage, while Robin and Angel switched places.

Starting this round, the show airs at 7:30 pm during Saturdays.

Voting for the acts starts after all the acts for the week have performed. There are two ways to vote. 
 SMS voting. Texting the name of the act to 2366.
 Online voting via Google. By typing the keyword PGT Vote in the search box, clickable photos of the contestants that had performed for that week will show up in the search results page; one Google account is entitled to one vote only.

Semifinals summary

Week 1 (March 24 & 25)
 Guest performer: PGT season 5 winner Power Duo

Week 2 (April 1)
Only 4 acts performed this week due to the Holy Week special programming until Black Saturday.

For this week, the three acts who did not win the public votes proceed to the judges' votes. In case the three acts received one vote each, the results return to the public vote.

 Guest performers: Eumee Lyn Capile, Elha Nympha, AC Bonifacio, Sam Shoaf, Nyoy Volante, and PGT season 5 finalist Mastermind

Week 3 (April 7 & 8)
Joven Olvido, Rico the Magician, and Antonio Bathan Jr. were previously announced to perform in this round, but due to circumstances so far unknown to viewers, their performances were rescheduled to the later rounds. Junior FMD Extreme, DWC Aeon Flex, Prinsipe Makata took their places.

 Guest performers: Jed Madela, BoybandPH, and TNT Boys

Week 4 (April 14 & 15)
Billy Crawford was absent in the Saturday show, and the show was solely hosted by Gonzaga due to Crawford being a guest in Sarah Geronimo's This 15 Me concert.

 Guest performers: Angeline Quinto, Erik Santos, Jason Dy, Noven Belleza, and PGT season 1 winner Jovit Baldivino

Week 5 (April 21 & 22)
This particular semifinal week was held outdoors at the MX Messiah Fairgrounds in Taytay, Rizal due to the size of stage required for the pool tables Jonacris Bandillo used and the dangerous nature of the fire acts of the Dancing Fire Warriors and Angel Fire New Gen. Due to safety concerns, CEBECO II Blue Knights held their semifinals performance in advance under broad daylight at an open field in Bogo, Cebu; several members were present in Taytay to personally hear the judges' comments.

Again, Gonzaga hosted the show without Crawford due to latter's wedding held a day before the semifinals.

 Guest performers: PGT season 5 runner-up The Amazing Pyra and YFSF: Kids season 1 winner Awra Briguela, with XB Gensan

Grand Finals 
Dubbed as "The Greatest Showdown", the grand finals took place at the Bren Z. Guiao Sports Complex and Convention Center over a span of two nights, the performance night (April 28) and the results night (April 29).

Just like in the semifinals, CEBECO II Blue Knights held their finals performance in advance under broad daylight at an open field in Bogo, Cebu due to safety concerns. The whole performance was taped in one take.

Still, Garcia missed the grand finals due to the death of his spouse.

Each grand final episode aired for 1 hour and 45 minutes from 7:15 PM to 9:00 PM.

The winner receives a vacation package from 2GO Travel and a cash prize of two million pesos. Just like the previous season, the winner will be based from the public votes (50%) and the scores of the judges (50%).

Guest performers: Gary Valenciano and Ogie Alcasid

Color key

Controversies and criticisms

South Korean forced to speak Tagalog
Robin Padilla drew flak from viewers after forcing a South Korean contestant to speak in Tagalog. In the episode aired on January 13, 2018, Kim Jiwan, a South Korean who has been living in the Philippines for ten years, asked Padilla to help him with his card trick. Padilla declined, demanding that Kim should speak in Tagalog: "Iho, Pilipinas Got Talent. Mag-Tagalog ka kasi magmumukha kaming katawa-tawa kung mag-i-English kami dito para sa'yo. Pilipinas Got Talent. Mag-Tagalog ka, iho." (Son, this is Pilipinas Got Talent. Speak in Tagalog because we will become a laughingstock if we speak in English just for you. This is Pilipinas Got Talent. Speak in Tagalog.) Co-judge Angel Locsin tried to alleviate the situation by teaching Kim some Tagalog phrases necessary for his performance. Locsin also allowed Kim to perform the trick on her instead. Padilla eventually participated in the trick and shook Kim's hand after the performance. Kim then apologized to the judges and promised to learn to speak Tagalog. Co-judge Vice Ganda also commented that Kim is obliged to learn Tagalog as a resident of the Philippines.

Viewers quickly turned to social media, stating that Padilla's attitude towards the Korean contestant was rude and racist. After being criticized by the netizens, Padilla did not express any remorse for his actions. He continued to comment on his Instagram account, with a middle finger emoji, saying: "Ako pa ba ang dapat magadjust sa isang dayuhan na 10 taon na sa Pilipinas? Naku hindi po mangyayari! Never!" (Am I supposed to adjust to a foreigner who has been living for 10 years in the Philippines? That won't happen! Never!)

Playgirls
In the March 3, 2018, episode, the Playgirls, a four-member girl group, washed a car while gyrating and twerking in their underwear. Angel Locsin pressed her buzzer a few seconds into the performance, later explaining that she did not want men to objectify the Playgirls. "Kaya ko kayo binuzz, ayaw kong ma-objectify kayo. Masyado ako nagmamalasakit para sa inyo para i-go ko 'to at patuloy kayong panoorin ng mga kalalakihan na ginagawa iyan." ("I buzzed you because I don't want you to be objectified. I care too much for you to allow you to be watched by men while you're doing that.") Robin Padilla then asked the Playgirls to clarify if the sultry performance was indeed their choice and if they enjoyed what they did, to which they replied "yes". Padilla then added, "Gusto niyo ba 'yun na mga kalalakihan ay humahanga sa inyo?" ("Do you like it that men admire you?"), to which Locsin protested, "Seryoso ka?" ("Are you serious?") Padilla then explained that he wanted to hear the performers' viewpoint, wherein they stood by their earlier performance. Padilla then acknowledged Locsin's statements, telling the Playgirls that Locsin—a women's rights advocate—intended to protect them. Padilla then apologized to Locsin.

The Playgirls' performance and the exchange between Padilla and Locsin sparked online discussions about the sexualization and objectification of women. Some netizens agreed with Locsin's position, while others interpreted her opinion as slut-shaming. The Playgirls themselves criticized Locsin on their own Facebook pages after the incident, pointing out her bikini costume when she played Darna back in 2005. Meanwhile, the Gabriela Women's Party commended Locsin "for her firm stance against the objectification of women".

Robin Padilla's sexist remarks towards Kristel de Catalina
In the sixth season of the show, Robin Padilla was criticized multiple times for his sexist and misogynistic remarks.

Semifinals 
During the semifinals, Robin Padilla was severely criticized by the viewers for his unsolicited comment to Kristel de Catalina. During the second week of live semifinals aired on April 1, 2018, Kristel de Catalina, a single mom, performed a spiral pole dance act that received a standing ovation from the judges and the audience. Angel Locsin was the first to comment, stating, "Ikaw ang pinakamabigat na makakalaban ng contestants ng PGT. Kailangan talaga nila mag-level up para makatapat sayo. Sobrang wow." ("You are the toughest contestant to beat in PGT. They really need to level up. You are overwhelming.") Locsin was followed by Robin Padilla. "Umpisa pa lang solb na ko sayo eh. Alam mo, 'di ako natakot sa lahat ng ginawa mo. Wala akong naramdamang takot kasi alam kong kayang kaya mo. Perfect yung [form] mo; precision." ("I've liked [your performance] from the start. I wasn't scared at all by everything you did, because I know you can really do it. Your form is perfect; you’ve got precision.") The last to comment was Vice Ganda. "Tapos na?" (It's over already?), he asked jokingly. "Tapos na, 'di ba? Thank you so much because you saved the night. Wala. Lampaso yung kalaban. Nilampaso mo yung kalaban." ("It's over, right? Thank you so much because you saved the night. You've swept away the competition and your competitors.") Vice Ganda also added, "Lalong nagpaganda pa 'yung simbolismo nung ginagawa mo, 'yung simbolismo na ginagawa mo na pinapakita mo sa buong mundo na ikaw ay isang solo parent. Ikaw ay isang babae at ang isang babae ay kayang umangat at magningning kahit nag-iisa." ("The symbolism of what you did all the more made things beautiful, how you are showing the whole world that you are a single parent. You are a woman, and a woman can rise above and shine although alone.") It was at this point when Robin Padilla suddenly spoke to the microphone, exclaiming, "Pero kailangan mo pa rin ng lalaki!" ("But you still need a man!") Vice Ganda immediately clarified, pointing to Padilla, "Para sa kanya 'yon. Para kay Robin 'yon." ("That's for him. That's for Robin.")

The viewers turned again to social media quickly, calling out Padilla for his sexist and misogynistic remark.

Grand Finals 
Padilla was once again under fire by netizens for his sexist and misogynistic comment made after Kristel de Catalina's grand final performance on April 28, 2018. Padilla commented first, saying, "Kristel, alam mo, 'yung mga ginagawa mo delikado, pero gusto kong malaman mo na kahit isang beses hindi ako ninerbiyos dahil alam ko napakagaling mo, napakahusay mo." ("Kristel, you know, what you’re doing is dangerous, but I want you to know that no matter how many times I watch you perform, I don’t get nervous, because I know that you are so great, you are so talented.") "Gusto ko lang malaman mo na gustong gusto ko na meron sa'yong nag-a-assist sa'yo na lalaki ngayon. Isang malaking bagay na makita ko ang assistant mo may lalaki diyan sa baba, hindi man katabi mo pero assistant mo," Padilla added. ("I just want you to know that I really like it that there's a guy assisting you now. It’s a huge thing for me to see that you have a male assistant there below; he may not be next to you, but he's still your assistant.")

The viewers slammed the judge through social media sites. One Twitter user called him out for tagging women as "individuals who cannot live without men".

Television ratings 
Television ratings for the sixth season of Pilipinas Got Talent on ABS-CBN are gathered from Kantar Media. Kantar Media uses a nationwide panel size of 2,610 urban and rural homes that represent 100% of total Philippine TV viewing population. It is a multinational market research group that specializes in audience measurement in more than 80 countries.

Color keys
 Highest rating during the season
 Lowest rating during the season

References

External links
 Pilipinas Got Talent (season 6) Online Auditions for Mindanao
 Pilipinas Got Talent on Facebook

Pilipinas Got Talent
2018 Philippine television seasons